Capital punishment in Hawaii ended in 1957 when it was still an organized incorporated territory of the United States. About 75 people were executed by the government, all for the crime of murder, and all by hanging. Additionally during and after World War II, at least seven U.S. servicemen were executed by the United States Armed Forces by order of a general court martial.

History
Under post-contact common law criminal justice, the penal laws of the Kingdom, Provisional Government, Republic, and U.S. incorporated Territory of Hawaii allowed for the execution of persons convicted of capital crimes.  The Espy file and historian Joseph Theroux account for about 75 individuals executed between the national and territorial governments, all for murder and all by hanging.

During and a few years after World War II, at least seven U.S. servicemen were executed by the United States Armed Forces by order of a general court martial between 1942 and 1947 at Schofield Barracks, all the cases involving either murder or rape. The executions were mostly by hanging and at least one of the executed servicemen was shot by a firing squad.

In 1957, Hawaii, then still an organized incorporated territory of the United States, abolished the death penalty. Hawaii became a state in 1959. Aside from Alaska, it is the only U.S. state that has never had the death penalty while a state.

Analysis 
Hawaii's death penalty has received criticism for almost exclusively targeting racial minorities within the country. Very few executions in Hawaii were of white Americans or Native Hawaiians, to the point where some Hawaiians speculated that the abolition of the death penalty occurred "because there were too many haole (Caucasians) who risked hanging." Statistics show that only one white man, an Irish man named Frank Johnson (alias John O'Connell), was ever executed in the Territory of Hawaii. The rest of the people confirmed to have been executed during that period were of various Asian nationalities, including Filipinos, Chinese people, Japanese people, and Koreans.

Modern use
Naeem Williams, a discharged soldier, was taken to federal civilian court for beating his 5-year-old daughter to death; this crime took place on US Government property while Williams was on active duty. Under a federal court a death sentence was sought. However, he was sentenced to life in prison without the possibility of parole instead.

List of people executed by the Hawaiian Kingdom, 1795–1894 

All 29 of the executions confirmed to have occurred in the Hawaiian Kingdom between its formation in 1795, and its transition to the Territory of Hawaii in 1894. All executions were carried out by hanging. Sources include the ESPY Files and Joseph Theroux's "A Short History of Hawaiian Executions, 1826-1947," as well as, for the first 13, Charles Wilkes's Narrative of the United States Exploring Expedition During the Years 1838, 1839, 1840, 1841, which did not go into specifics about each of the 13 executions but only broke down the number of executions on each Hawaiian island (3 on Kauai, 7 on Oahu, 2 on Maui, and 1 on the island of Hawaii). Sources for some of the executions between 1846 and 1889 include the Annual Report of the Chief Justice, 1858, and the Biennial Report of the Chief Justice, 1882.

List of people executed by the Territory of Hawaii, 1894–1959 
All 49 of the men confirmed to have been executed by the Territory of Hawaii prior to the pre-statehood abolition of the death penalty in 1957. Only civilian executions; not including military executions. All executions were carried out by hanging. Sources include the ESPY Files and Joseph Theroux's "A Short History of Hawaiian Executions, 1826-1947."

References

Additional reading
FindLaw: Hawaii Capital Punishment Laws

 
1957 disestablishments in Hawaii
Capital punishment in the United States by state
Hawaii law